The Copa del Rey 1920 was the 20th staging of the Copa del Rey, the Spanish football cup competition.

The competition started in March 1920 and concluded on May 2, 1920, with the Final, held at El Molinón in Gijon, in which FC Barcelona lifted the trophy for the fourth time with a 2–0 victory over Athletic Bilbao.

Teams
 Biscay: Athletic de Bilbao
Gipuzkoa: Real Unión
 Centre: Madrid FC
 South: Sevilla FC
Galicia: Real Vigo Sporting
Asturias: Sporting de Gijón
 Catalonia: FC Barcelona

Quarterfinals

First leg

Second leg

Athletic de Bilbao qualified for the semifinals.

Real Vigo qualified for the semifinals.

Byes: Real Unión, FC Barcelona (drawn against Sevilla FC, who withdrew after their proposal to play both legs in Madrid was rejected).

Semifinals

First leg

Second leg

FC Barcelona qualified for the final.

Athletic de Bilbao qualified for the final.

Final

References
RSSSF.com
Linguasport.com

1920
1920 domestic association football cups
Copa